= Elemental tetrad =

Game design conceptual framework

The elemental tetrad is a conceptual framework used in game design, which consists of four interconnected elements: mechanics, aesthetics, stories, and technology.

== Description ==
Mechanics describe the rules of the game, including how players interact, engage, and progress in it.

Story is the sequence of events that unfolds in a game, and can be linear, non-linear, or even random. This element is also sometimes referred to as the narrative to include broader story elements, such as the premise and characters of the game.

Aesthetics define how the game is perceived by the player's senses. Aesthetics has the most direct relationship to the player’s experience and is present in almost all aspects of the game.

Technology refers to the medium that the game is played on, along with the advantages and disadvantages that the medium might bring. Compared to the other three elements, technology is the furthest removed from the player.
